Leptothecata, or thecate hydroids, are an order of hydrozoans in the phylum Cnidaria. Their closest living relatives are the athecate hydroids, which are similar enough to have always been considered closely related, and the very apomorphic Siphonophorae, which were placed outside the "Hydroida". Given that there are no firm rules for synonymy for high-ranked taxa, alternative names like Leptomedusa, Thecaphora or Thecata, with or without the ending emended to "-ae", are also often used for Leptothecata.

Leptothecata is surrounded by a chitinous outer layer as its exoskeleton, including gonophores, their reproductive organ. Leptothecata obtain radial symmetry, in which their gonads can be found in their radial canals. Their morphological characters normally have ranged from benthic to planktonic stages. Characters associated with benthic are the polyps and colony forms, while planktonic is medusae. Leptothecata has a vast and complex variation among all species within the hydrozoan clade. Thecata colonies also have extensive specialization due to their polyps function and variation. Most Leptothecata possess statocysts, which are used for defense and protection. The classes that have lost their statocysts have been changed ancestrally over time rather than a direct loss.

The approximately 1,900 species of Leptothecata are characterized by a number of features: Their polyps are always living in colonies with the hydranths set in hydrotheca which are usually permanent and often long enough so the animal can fully retract into it; some have very reduced hydrothecae resembling Anthoathecata. There is a single whorl of tentacles.

The gonophores are borne on much reduced hydranths and usually protected in a peridermal gonotheca. Medusae forming on fully developed hydranths are extremely rare; usually the gonophores develop into medusae or into sessile sporosacs. The medusae have a shallow bell, bear the gonads on their radial canals, and usually have statocysts which are formed only from epidermal tissue and more than four tentacles and. The cnidome never has stenoteles.

Characteristics 
Colony architecture among Leptothecata comprises extensive diversity found in the hydrozoans. Their life cycles have been found to be connected with changes in colony shapes. Zooid polymorphism within the colonies are usually specialized. Polyps that make up the colonies tend to have three specialities and functions. First being the gastrozooid, which has their speciality of nutrition and digesting the food. Second, the gonozooid which is the reproductive polyp. Third, being the dactylozooid which function works in defense for the colony. The dactylozooid recently had become more highly variable with not being present in some thecata colony forms, and only possessing the gastrozooid and gonozooid polyps.

Thecata colonies have detectable shapes and arrangements allowing for distinguishing classification between one another. One major shape is when the colonies are erected off a branched colony. Another major shape of thecata is where the colonies can be erected off an unbranched stem. Stolonal colonies are a final major type where their polyps are connected to the creeping part of the colony. Where most cases of the erected branched shape have been found to be derived over time.

Medusae tend to be pelagic. But there are specific medusae species while at the medusa stage can still remain benthic. Polyps can also be free floating, which are called pelagic polyps. Similarly, their gastroular and nervous system have great complexity, as well as their shape. While medusae due tend to lack any presence of visible sense organs. Leptothecata have significant synapomorphies that are present in most of all their species. In regards to their gastrozooids, Lephtothecata have the theca layer on their polyps. Which has allowed the synapomorphy for Leptothecata to form hydrothecae that is also made of theca, that surrounds the gonozooid.

Reproduction and Development 
Leptothecata have distinguishing factors in the presence of morphological dimorphism. The dimorphism in the species classes has led to great complexity within their taxonomic identification. Majority of the thecate hydroids use asexual reproduction in response to budding. They have also been known for their plasticity, allowing them to adapt and grow in their given environment. Thecata's branch has a mutual similarity based on mature gamete localization, where they posses their mature gametes located through their radial canals.

Location 
Among Leptothecata’s diversified species, they have great variability within their organization and life cycles. Leptothecata can be found worldwide in all marine environments. The location of where Leptothecata are found ranges from shallow waters to the deep sea, most being marine species. In their polyp and medusa form, due to natural factors they can travel outside their native location. This is usually done by currents or if attached to other vertebrates. Due to the hydroids' broad range of locations, they also have been known to play in many ecosystem factors. They provide shelter and protection and are a known food source for other marine species. Leptothecata has been the main attraction in many great expeditions and studies due to the  broad spectrum of thecate hydroids within their order. These developments have led to further discoveries of finding locations where thecate hydroids can be relatively rich in the marine environment. Allowing researchers to study a range of differences based on the colonies, the hydrotheca and even the pairs of thecae themselves.

Notable Species of Leptothecata 
 Air fern (Sertularia argentea), sold dried as novelty "plants" and aquarium ornaments
 Crystal jelly (Aequorea victoria), a bioluminescent hydrozoan
 Sea fur (Obelia spp.), a common coastal polyp and medusa

Taxonomy and systematics
The thecate hydroids were formerly placed in the paraphyletic "Hydroida" as the suborder Leptomedusa. Currently, the following families are classified within the order Leptothecata:
 Basal and incertae sedis
 Leptothecata
 Family
 Family Aequoreidae 
 Family Barcinidae 
 Family Blackfordiidae
 Family Bonneviellidae
 Family Campanulariidae
 Family Campanulinidae 
 Family Cirrholoveniidae 
 Family Clathrozoidae
 Family Dipleurosomatidae
 Family Eirenidae
 Family Haleciidae
 Family Hebellidae 
 Family Lafoeidae 
 Family Laodiceidae 
 Family Lineolariidae 
 Family Lovenellidae 
 Family Malagazziidae 
 Family Melicertidae 
 Family Mitrocomidae 
 Family Octocannoididae 
 Family Orchistomatidae 
 Family †Palaequoreidae
 Family Phialellidae 
 Family Phialuciidae
 Family Staurothecidae 
 Family Sugiuridae 
 Family Symplectoscyphidae 
 Family Syntheciidae 
 Family Teclaiidae 
 Family Tiarannidae 
 Family Tiaropsidae 
 Family Zygophylacidae 
 Superfamily Plumularioidea
 Family Aglaopheniidae 
 Family Halopterididae 
 Family Kirchenpaueriidae
 Family Phylactothecidae  
 Family Plumaleciidae 
 Family Plumulariidae
 Family Schizotrichidae 
 Superfamily Sertularioidea
 Family Sertularellidae
 Family Sertulariidae 
 Family Thyroscyphidae

References

  (2008): Leptomedusae. Retrieved 2008-JUL-08.
  (2005a): The Hydrozoa Directory - Hydrozoan Phylogeny and Classification. Retrieved 2008-JUL-08.
  (2005b): The Hydrozoa Directory - Order Leptomedusae Haeckel, 1879. Retrieved 2008-JUL-08.
 
 

Cnidarian orders
 
Hydroidolina